Numbered Days may refer to:
"Numbered Days", a song by Killswitch Engage from Alive or Just Breathing, 2002
"Numbered Days", a song by Eels from Shootenanny!, 2003
Días contados, a 1994 Spanish film titled Numbered Days in English-speaking markets